Rafik Mansour is an American diplomat and Minister-Counselor who served as Chargé d'affaires of the U.S. Embassy in Singapore from 2019 to 2021. He previously served as interim Deputy Chief of Mission and Chargé d'affaires of the U.S. Embassy in Yerevan, Armenia.

Education
Mansour obtained a Bachelor of Science degree in biology and a Bachelor of Arts degree in French literature from the University of California, Irvine, and a master's degree in national security strategy from the National War College.

References

Naval War College alumni
University of California, Irvine alumni
Ambassadors of the United States to Singapore
Ambassadors of the United States to Armenia
Year of birth missing (living people)
Living people